Hans Kammerlander (born 6 December 1956, Bolzano, South Tyrol, Italy) is an Italian mountaineer, living in Ahornach, a hamlet nearby Sand in Taufers. He has climbed 13 of the 14 8000m peaks. In 1984, together with Reinhold Messner he was the first climber to traverse two 8000 m peaks before descending to base camp.

Biography 

He teamed with Messner, the first man to climb all fourteen 8000m peaks, on successful climbs of Cho Oyu, Gasherbrum I and II, Dhaulagiri, Annapurna, Makalu, and Lhotse, and is a UIAGM mountain guide (English, International Federation of Mountain Guide Associations). Chris Bonington described Messner's relationship with Kammerlander as the most "amicable" of Messner's climbing partnerships.

Since 1996, he held the Guinness World Record for the fastest ascent without supplemental oxygen of Mount Everest (16 hours and 45 minutes) and fastest ascent from Everest North Base Camp.

In 1990 he made the first ski descent of Nanga Parbat. In 1996 he failed in an attempt to be the first to ski down Mount Everest, after removing his skis and climbing down from 300 metres below the summit, skiing down from 7700m, although he set a then speed record during that attempt of 17 hours to climb from base camp to the summit of Everest via the North Col. Kammerlander also abandoned an attempt to be the first to ski from the summit of K2 when he saw a Korean climber fall to his death.

In 2001 Kammerlander announced that he would not attempt to climb Manaslu, necessary to complete all 8000m peaks, due to losing several close friends on an attempt on the mountain.

In 2012, Kammerlander claimed to be the first man to have climbed the Seven Second Summits, the second highest summits on all seven continents. However, there are claims that Kammerlander may have only climbed the lower West Summit of Mount Logan. It is also claimed that Puncak Trikora, climbed by Kammerlander as part of the challenge, is not the second highest summit in Oceania. In which case Kammerlander will have to climb the main summit of Mount Logan, and climb Puncak Mandala in New Guinea to complete the Seven Second Summits.

Works
Abstieg zum Erfolg (2000) Piper Verlag GmbH, .Fou d'altitude (2001) Guerin, .Sopra e sotto. Storie di montagna (with Ingrid Beikircher, V. Montagna) (2004) Piper Verlag GmbH, .Unten und oben: Berggeschichten (with Raimund Prinoth) (2005) Piper Verlag GmbH, .Am seidenen Faden: K2 und andere Grenzerfahrungen (2005) Piper Verlag GmbH, .Appeso a un filo di seta. Il K2 e altre esperienze estreme (with V. Montagna) (2006) Corbaccio, .Windgeflüster: Hans Kammerlander 50 (with Sigi Pircher) (2006) Athesia Gmbh Verlagsansta, .Direttissima zum Erfolg: Was (Automobil-)Manager vom Höhenbergsteigen lernen können (2008) Piper Verlag GmbH, .Bergsüchtig: Klettern und Abfahren in der Todeszone (2009) Piper Verlag GmbH, .Malato di montagna'' (with A. Di Bello) (2009) Corbaccio, .

See also
List of 20th-century summiters of Mount Everest

References

1956 births
Living people
Alpine guides
Italian mountain climbers
Italian male ski mountaineers
Italian male writers
Sportspeople from Bolzano
Italian summiters of Mount Everest